Adana Province is a province of Turkey located in central Cilicia. With a population of 2,274,106 according to official estimates as at 31 December 2022, it is the sixth most populous province in Turkey. The administrative seat of the province is the city of Adana, home to 78¼ % of the residents of the province. It is also closely associated with other Cilician provinces of Mersin, Osmaniye, and (northern) Hatay.

Geography

The southern and central portion of the province mostly falls within the Çukurova Plain (historically known as the Cilician Plain), to the north, the plains give way to the Taurus Mountains (Turkish: Toros Dağları). The provinces adjacent to it are Mersin to the west, Hatay to the southeast, Osmaniye to the east, Kahramanmaraş to the northeast, Kayseri to the north, and Niğde to the northwest.

Governance

Two levels of government are involved in the administration of the Adana Province: the Central and the Provincial. Adana Governorship is the provincial branch of the Central government and Adana Province Special Administration is the provincial governing body. The province is divided into 15 districts and each district is divided into municipalities and villages. Municipalities are further divided into neighborhoods.

Adana Governorship
The central government in Ankara has the majority of the power in the administration of the province through Adana Governorship. The governorship oversees the functioning of provincial and regional directorates of the ministries and other governmental agencies. Provincial directorates cover Adana Province only, whereas Regional directorates cover Çukurova and in some cases additional provinces. Provincial and regional directorates of the Central Government include, but are not limited to;
Provincial Directorates: Education, Healthcare, Tourism and Culture, Youth and Sports, Environment and Forestry, Social Services, Agriculture, Industry and Trade, Police Services, Defense, Population and Citizenship, Employment Agency, Social Security Institution.
Regional Directorates: Turkish State Railways, Statistics Institute, Foundations, Meteorology.

The Grand National Assembly (TBMM) is the only law-making authority in Turkey and Adana Province is represented in it with 14 members. The last TBMM elections were held on June 7th, 2015 and in the Adana Province, the conservative AKP took 5 seats, social-democratic Kemalist CHP took 4 seats, nationalist MHP took 3 seats and Democratic socialist HDP took 2 seats.

Province Special Administration

Adana Province Special Administration is a semi-democratic provincial governing body that has three organs; Provincial Parliament, Governor and the Encümen. Provincial Parliament members are elected democratically, the governor is appointed by the Central Government and 4 out of 8 members of the Encümen are appointed by the governor.

Province Special Administration is not a jurisdiction and has minor executive power in the administration of the province running with a budget of 55 million TL for 2010. The major executive duties of Special Administration are; building and maintenance of schools, residences and daycares, building and maintenance of other governmental buildings, roads, promoting arts and culture, protection and conservation of nature, social services and regional planning.

Provincial Parliament
Adana Provincial Parliament is the decision making organ of the Province Special Administration. It is formed of 61 members who represent the 15 districts. Members of the Parliament are nominated by the district branches of the National Parties during the Local Elections and are elected by the d'Hondt method. Each district is an electoral district and there is a 10% threshold for a party to gain seat at the district. There is no threshold at the provincial level.  Parliament is administered by the president, two vice-presidents, and two secretary generals who are elected from the members. Current chair of the parliament is Abdullah Torun.

Current Composition of the Parliament

The last election for the Provincial Parliament was held on March 29, 2009. Voting turnout was a high of 84.1% and 5 parties gained seat at the parliament. The results of the election were

After the election the sole DP member moved to MHP raising the seats of MHP to 24. Currently, DP does not hold a seat at the parliament.

Governorship

Governor

Provincial Governor is the chief executive of the Adana Province. The governor is appointed by the advice of the National Ministry of Internal Affairs to the Cabinet with the approval of the President of the Republic. İlhan Atış has been governor of the province since 2007.

District Governors are the chief executives of their districts.  Districts are merely an administrative divisions of the province and the District Governors work under the Provincial Governor.

Historic List of Governor of Adana

Encümen
Encümen is the executive committee of the Adana Province Special Administration, consisting of 11 members. The governor is the chair of the Encümen. 5 members are chosen by the Provincial Parliament among their members annually and 5 members are the departmental directors of the APSA appointed by the governor annually.

Municipalities
There are total of 37 municipalities in the Adana Province. City of Adana has a two-tier municipality structure where the metropolitan municipality forms the upper tier and the 5 district municipalities, Seyhan, Yüreğir, Çukurova, Sarıçam and Karaisalı form the lower-tier. Municipal councillors of the metropolitan municipality are chosen from the district municipal councillors by the respective municipal councils. 10 district municipalities and 21 township municipalities are the other municipalities of the province.

The municipalities have three organs; municipal council, mayor and the encümen, the executive committee. Municipal councillors and the mayors are elected at the local elections. Encümen is formed by members half chosen from the council and the other half appointed by the mayor.

Neighborhoods

Mahala is the smallest administrative unit within a municipality, administered by the Muhtar and the Neighborhood Seniors Council consisting of 4 members. Mahala administration is not an incorporation therefore does not hold government status. Although elected by the neighborhood residents, Muhtars are not granted any power nor budget, thus merely act as an administrator of the district Governor. Muhtar also voices the neighborhood issues to the municipal governments together with the Seniors Council. The Muhtar and the council members are elected by plurality at the local elections. Neighborhood administrators are not affiliated with political parties.

Villages
Villages are settlements that have a population less than 2000. In the Adana Province there are total of 469 villages, which are scattered through all the districts except Seyhan. Villages are administered by the muhtar and the Village Seniors Council. The council can have four, five or six members depending on the population of the village. Unlike the neighborhood Muhtars, village Muhtars are granted special powers and the village administration is considered to be a governmental body.

Population

The population of the Adana Province as at 31 December 2022 was 2,274,106. 88% of the population lives in the urban areas making the province one of the most urbanized provinces in Turkey. Annual population growth of the province is 0.76%, below the average growth of the nation. 78¼ % of the province's residents (corresponding to a population of 1,779,463) live in the city of Adana, which is made up of the whole of Seyhan District and most of Yüreğir, Çukurova and Sarıçam districts.

Museums and Heritage Sites
Adana Province has  160 km. of coastline mostly free from human activities. Karataş and Yumurtalık are the two small settlements at the coast which host cottage dwellers and local tourism. Rest of the coast has conservation areas, farmlands and forests. With the ancient settlements, national parks, waterfalls, highlands and mountains, Adana Province has a mixture of different settings.

Museums
Adana Archeological Museum in the city of Adana
Adana Ethnography Museum
Adana Atatürk Museum
Misis Mosaic Museum

Historical Sites

Toprakkale (Misis)
Dumlu Castle (Ceyhan)
Yilankale (Snake Castle)
Historical neighborhood of Tepebağ (Adana)
Ramazanoğlu Hall (Adana)
Kurtkulağı Caravanserai in Ceyhan
Hayriye Hanım Hall in Reşatbey neighborhood of Adana
Çarşı Hamam (Adana)
Büyük Saat Clock Tower and the Bedesten (bazaar) in the city of Adana
Taşköprü: 4th century Roman Bridge in the city of Adana
Kozan Castle and Monastery
Ulucamii in the city of Adana
Hasan Ağa Masjid (Adana)
Yağ Camii in the city of Adana
Saint Paul Church (Bebekli Kilise) in the city of Adana
Süleyman's Tower (Yumurtalık)

Ancient Settlements

Parks and Conservation Areas

Akyatan Lagoon is a large wildlife refuge which acts as a stopover for migratory birds voyaging from Africa to Europe. Wildlife refuge has a 14700-hectare area made up of forests, lagoon, marsh, sandy and reedy lands. Akyatan lake is a nature wonder with endemic plants and endangered bird species living in it together with other species of plants and animals. 250 species of birds are observed during a study in 1990. The conservation area is located 30 km south of Adana, near Tuzla.

Yumurtalık Nature Reserve covers an area of 16,430 hectares within the Seyhan-Ceyhan delta, with its lakes, lagoons and wide collection of plant and animal species. The area is an important location for many species of migrating birds, the number gets higher during the winters when the lakes become a shelter when other lakes further north freeze.

Aladağlar National Park, located north of Adana, is a huge park of around 55,000 hectares, the summit of Demirkazik at 3756m is the highest point in the middle Taurus mountain range. There is a huge range of flora and fauna, and visitors may fish in the streams full of trout. Wildlife includes wild goats, bears, lynx and sable. The most common species of plant life is black pine and cluster pine trees, with some cedar dotted between, and fir trees in the northern areas with higher humidity. The Alpine region, from the upper borders of the forest, has pastures with rocky areas and little variety of plant life because of the high altitude and slope.

Mountains and Plateaus

The Taurus Mountains contain many plateaus:

 Aladağ Meydan Plateau
 Aladağ Ağcakise, Başpınar Bıcı ve Kosurga Plateaus
 Feke İnderesi Village Plateaus
 Karaisalı Kızıldağ Plateau
 Karaisalı Kapıkaya Canyon
 Kozan-Horzum and Çulluuşağı Plateaus
 Kozan Göller Plateau
 Pozantı- Akçatekir Plateau
 Pozantı-Armutoluğu Plateau
 Pozantı Fındıklı Village Plateau
 Pozantı Belemedik Plateau
 Pozantı Asar Plateau
 Saimbeyli Çatak Plateau
 Tufanbeyli Kürebeli Plateau
 Tufanbeyli Obruk Plateau

Festivals
Altın Koza International Film Festival (07-13 June)
International Sabancı Theater Festival (March 27- April 30)
İmamoğlu Peach Festival - İmamoğlu (June)
Kızıldağ Karakucak Wrestling Festival - Karaisalı
Cherry Festival - Saimbeyli (20–22 June)

Gallery

See also 
 List of populated places in Adana Province
 Adana Province, Ottoman Empire (disambiguation)
 Akçatekir
 Bozgüney, Adana
 Çelemli

References

External links
 Adana Governorship — adana.gov.tr
 Adana Metropolitan Municipality — adana.bel.tr
 Pictures of the capital of this province — pbase.com
 Adana Guide — adanaburada.net
 Adana News — adanacafenet.net